Nurse Edith Cavell is a 1939 American film directed by British director Herbert Wilcox about Edith Cavell.
The film was nominated at the 1939 Oscars for Best Original Score.

Plot

The story follows the broadly true story of Edith Cavell who went to German-occupied Brussels after the onset of the First World War.

Edith hides the young Frenchman Jean Rappard, but is suspected of this and her hospital is inspected by German troops at regular intervals. Jean is put on a canal barge and despite being searched at the border escapes successfully.

Back in Brussels a firing squad executes a dozen escaped prisoners who were caught in the woods. Edith and Albert go to try to find wounded on a battlefield near the woods and bring back four British men including Pte Bungey of the Buffs. They are hidden in the hospital in a secret room accessed through a wardrobe in the basement boiler room. The Countess goes to the cobbler to organise their safe transportation.

Meanwhile Edith also tends the young dying Germans in the main hospital. A further three Frenchmen are sent to the border by barge with Mme Moulin.

An alleged escaped French PoW arrives at the Countess's mansion. The Countess is suspicious due to his accent and locks him in the kitchen whilst informing the German authorities. The hospital is also being watched. Nevertheless the numbers increase ... but they include Wilhelm Schultz of the German military intelligence. He therefore works out how Edith and the Countess operate. Esch person is given new ID papers and money.

On 5 August 1915 Edith is arrested and placed in the Prison of St Gilles. A campaign begins to release her, but the Germans wish to "set an example" and wish her shot.

In the court she is charged with the far more serious crime of espionage. The very young Francois Rappard is brought into the court (in handcuffs) as the critical non-military witness. The authorities point out that the people who were helped returned to the front and killed Germans. Edith admits to having had helped at least 200 men escape. The three military judges go to decide her sentence. She is read the sentence in her cell by Cpt. Heinrichs: she is to be shot at dawn.

The authorities are evasive when they are asked by the British consul to give the result of the trial. Pleas for clemency are ignored.

Some of the proposed firing squad say they are ill as they do not wish to shoot a woman. But on the allotted morning eight soldiers shoot her dead.

On May 15, 1919 a memorial service is held in Westminster Abbey.

Cast 
Anna Neagle as Nurse Edith Cavell
Edna May Oliver as Countess de Mavon
George Sanders as Capt. Heinrichs
May Robson as Mme. Rappard
ZaSu Pitts as Mme. Moulin
H. B. Warner as Hugh Gibson the British consul
Sophie Stewart as Sister Williams
Mary Howard as Nurse O'Brien
Robert Coote as Private Bungey
Martin Kosleck as Pierre
Gui Ignon as Cobbler
Lionel Royce as Gen. von Ehrhardt
Jimmy Butler as Jean Rappard
Rex Downing as François Rappard
Henry Brandon as Lt. Schultz
Fritz Leiber as Edith's defence lawyer
Ernst Deutsch as the Chief Prosecutor
Halliwell Hobbes as the pastor who gives the last rites

Reception
The film made a profit of $38,000. Modern Screen gave the film 4 out of 4 stars, stating that the film was "a powerful message against war and hatred", and that it maintained its level of suspense throughout the course of the picture. They praised the acting, particularly that of Anna Neagle in the title role, as well as May Robson, Edna May Oliver, and ZaSu Pitts, in their roles of women who aid the fleeing soldiers. The performance of Rex Downing was called "notable", and that of Lionel Royce was described as "stand-out". Also commended were George Sanders, Mary Howard, Sophie Stewart and H.B. Warner. The magazine was especially enthusiastic of Herbert Wilcox's direction, in that he managed to make every part credible, and even the roles of the "heavies" managed to be shown with compassion and understanding.

Awards and nominations

See also
The Martyrdom of Nurse Cavell (1916)
Nurse Cavell (1916)
The Woman the Germans Shot (1918)
Dawn (1928)

References

External links 

1939 films
1930s war drama films
1930s biographical drama films
American black-and-white films
1930s English-language films
American World War I films
American war drama films
Films based on British novels
Films directed by Herbert Wilcox
Films set in Brussels
American biographical drama films
1939 drama films
RKO Pictures films
1930s American films